This is a list of notable people from Thalassery (formerly Tellicherry[2]), a commercial town[1] on the Malabar Coast in Kannur district, in the state of Kerala, India. The town is bordered by the districts of Mahé (Pondicherry) and Kozhikode.

Notable people from Thalassery
 Rao Sahib Dr.Ayyathan Gopalan(1861-1948), Indian physician, Social reformer of Kerala, Philanthropist, Leader and Propagandist of Brahmo Samaj(1898) and founder of Sugunavardhini movement(1900) and Depressed Classes Mission(1909)in Kerala.
 Dr.Ayyathan Janaki Ammal(1881-1945) first female doctor& Surgeon of Kerala, First female Malayali doctor.
Janaki Ammal (1897-1984), Padmashri awarded botanist, cytologist, geneticist
 M K Vainu Bappu (1927–1982), president of the International Astronomical Union who jointly discovered the Wilson-Bappu effect and who helped establish several astronomical institutions in India including the Vainu Bappu Observatory and the modern Indian Institute of Astrophysics. Bappu was the first Indian to have a comet and an asteroid named after him.
 Air Marshal Raghunath Nambiar, former Air Officer Commanding-in-Chief (AOC-in-C), Western Air Command.
 M.V. Devan, noted painter, sculptor, and former Chairman of Kerala Lalit Kala Akademi.
 Hermann Gundert (1814–1893), German missionary and scholar whose works in Malayalam during his 20-year residence in Thalassery include the first school text book, the first dictionary, and the first newspaper, Rajyasamacharam.
 Moorkoth Kumaran (1874–1941), teacher, short story writer, and the first biographer of Sree Narayana Guru.
 Smt CK Revathi Amma( 1892 to 1980) Writer, Kerala Sahitya Academy winner for her autobiography "SAHASRAPOORNIMA", Social worker, Worked tirelessly to uplift women by education and self employment. 
 Keeleri Kunhikannan (1858–1939), pioneer of circus in Kerala.
 William Logan (1841–1914), a Scottish historian whose works are considered some of the most reliable historical references of North Malabar by governments and universities.
 O Chandu Menon (1847–1899), author of Indulekha(novel), the first significant (or top selling) modern Malayalam classic novel. 
 Vengayil Kunhiraman Nayanar (1861–1914), author of the first Malayalam short story, Vasanavikriti.
 Raghavan Master, Malayalam film music composer who won the Padma Shri award. 
 Veera Kerala Varma Pazhassi Raja (1753–1805), leader of resistance in the Cotiote War with the English East India Company. 
 Wing Commander Moorkoth Ramunni IFAS (1914–2009), the first Keralan pilot and first chief trainer of India's National Defence Academy.Picture Gallery | Current Affairs | Tribute to Moorkoth Ramunni. Manorama Online (14 June 2013).
 N Prabhakaran, writer who won a Kerala Sahitya Akademi Award.
 Mattannoor Sankarankutty (M.P. Sankarankutty Marar), Chenda percussionist who won the Padma Shri award.Feats of excellence. The Hindu, (27 September 2012).Prof. M.N. Vijayan(1930–2007), orator and writer.
 Njattyela Sreedharan, lexicographer known for compiling a dictionary connecting four major Dravidian languages Malayalam, Kannada, Tamil and Telugu.

Rayaroth Kuttambally Krishna Kumar: (18 July 1938 – 1 January 2023) was an Indian business executive who was the director of Tata Sons.[3] He was a member of Tata Administrative Services and served as a trustee of Sir Dorabji Tata Trust[4] and Sir Ratan Tata Trust, which hold a 66 per cent stake in Tata Sons.[5] He played a significant role in several acquisitions by Tata Group, including the £271 million buy-out of Tetley in 2000, which made Tata Global Beverages the second-largest tea company in the world.[3] The Government of India awarded him the fourth-highest civilian honour of the Padma Shri in 2009 for his contributions to Indian trade and industry.[6]

References

People from Thalassery
Lists of people from Kerala
Lists of people by city in India